Barrón is a village and concejo in Ribera Alta, Álava, Basque Country, Spain. Barrón formerly belonged to the hermandad and municipality of Lacozmonte, which was part of Ribera Alta until 1927. Barrón is located in western Álava province, 30 km west of Vitoria and 24 km north of Miranda of Ebro, along the highway that connects Pobes with Valdegovía. It is a small village of roughly 12 inhabitants.

Geography 
Barrón is located at  about sea level, on the slope of a mountain in the Arcamo range. It is surrounded by forests of carrasca and pine trees and fields of grains and potatoes.

Cultural heritage 
Among Barrón's historic buildings are the house-tower of the Barrón y Mendoza family (a Gothic building from the 14th century) and the Barrón Lobera (a moat-like structure with convergent walls that was once used to hunt wolves).

Notable residents 
Barrón is the birthplace of Juan de Lezcano (1866–1899), an Augustinian student of Arabic who is considered one of the first Spanish orientalists.

References

Populated places in Álava